The Scots Guards are a regiment of the British Army. The regiment cherishes its traditions, especially on the parade ground where the scarlet uniform and bearskin have become synonymous with the regiment and the other Guards regiments. The regiment takes part in numerous events, most notably the Beating Retreat, Changing of the Guard, Queen's Birthday Parade, Remembrance Sunday and State Visits. The Guards' regiments ceremonial uniforms differ from each other only slightly, the differentiations being in the tunic and the type of plume on the bearskin, if any, they have. The Scots Guards uniform consists of tunic buttons in threes, the Order of the Thistle on the shoulder badge, the Thistle on the collar badge and no plume on the bearskin.

World War II history

Both battalions were back in the UK by 1946, having returned from Germany and Trieste respectively. In 1948, the 1st Battalion assumed the role of Guards Training Battalion, a role that lasted until 1951.

The Malayan Emergency 
The 2nd Battalion of the Scots Guards, as a part of the 2nd Guards Brigade was deployed to Malaya in October to crush a communist led anti-colonial uprising known as the Malayan Emergency. The communist rebels, known as the Malayan National Liberation Army (MNLA), were led by veteran anti-fascist and trade union leader Chin Peng, were a continuation of an earlier communist guerrilla force known as the Malayan Peoples' Anti-Japanese Army which was funded by the British to resist the Japanese occupation of Malaya.

During its time in Malaya, the 2nd Battalion performed a variety of duties, including, in their involvement in the Emergency, guarding duties,  patrolling into the dense jungle, and assaults upon MNLA guerrillas. The patrols were difficult for the Commonwealth forces, who did not know where the MNLA guerrillas were positioned, and who had to contend with all the many aspects of the jungle, such as the diverse animals and sounds that make the jungle their home (especially leeches), with the soldiers having probably been accustomed to living in relatively wide-open cities. A very apparent danger was the deadly booby traps laid by the MNLA Patrols at times, despite hard slogging in the energy-sapping jungle, gave very little to show for the hard-work, but when contact was made with the MNLA, it invariably ended in fierce, close-quarters combat, with much valour and professionalism often displayed by the battalion. By the time the battalion departed Malaya in 1951 for home. it had lost thirteen officers and other ranks. Britain declared victory over the MNLA on 31 July 1960, ending the Malayan Emergency.

The Batang Kali Massacre 
Several months after being stationed in Malaya, the Scots Guards committed war crimes by executing innocent and unarmed villagers and burning down civilian homes. This event became known as the Batang Kali massacre.

In December 1948, the Scots Guards surrounded a rubber plantation close to the Batang Kali river and rounded up the entire population of the village, approximately 50 people. Soon afterwards the Scots Guards began abusing the villagers and started psychologically torturing them by staging mock executions. After segregating the men from the women and children, the Scots Guards rounded up all the men and executed them all, with one exception who survived by playing dead. The Scots Guards had murdered 24 unarmed civilians, and afterwards burnt down the village after evicting all the women and children. Many of the bodies of those executed were found to have been mutilated.

The Batang Kali massacre has been described as both "Britain's My Lai", and the killings as "one of the most contentious in British colonial history." In order to protect the Scots Guards, senior British diplomats introduced a "license to kill" law to legalise British colonial war crimes. Despite pleas from the families of the victims, British courts ruled against the families, citing that the year the massacre was committed. However British courts had conceded that the massacre had indeed taken place, after hearing witness testimonies from member of the Scots Guards, the victim's families, and by examining declassified British military archives.

The Cyprus Emergency and Suez Crisis 
In late 1951, the 1st Battalion deployed to Cyprus with the rest of the 32nd Guards Brigade, and in February the following year, the battalion deployed to the Suez Canal Zone after the Egyptian government abrogated the Anglo-Egyptian Treaty of 1936 which had given the British a base in the Suez Canal Zone, and was intended to expire in 1956. During its time in Egypt, the battalion performed a number of tasks, including the usual patrolling and guarding, which at times, tended to be monotonous and uneventful, though at others, such duties sometimes involved incidents which included coming under attack from Egyptians, including by snipers as well as rioting taking place. The battalion remained in Egypt until late 1954, when it, and the rest of the 32nd Guards Brigade, departed after a Treaty was signed between the two countries, which agreed that British and Egyptian technicians would maintain the base, and that a gradual phase-out of British forces in Egypt would begin, with the last British forces leaving Egypt in June 1956. During its time in Egypt the battalion suffered a single fatality.

Reorganisation, African colonialism, and Borneo 
Also in 1952, Queen Elizabeth succeeded to the throne, and became the regiment's fifth Colonel-in-Chief since the first, King Edward VII, in 1901. Also in 1952, the regiment formed a new alliance with the 3rd Battalion, The Royal Australian Regiment, an alliance that remains intact as of 2004. In July 1953, the 2nd Battalion deployed to West Germany to join the 4th Guards Brigade at Hubbelrath, part of the British Army of the Rhine, and returned home in 1957. That year the 1st Battalion headed for Hubbelrath to join the 4th Guards Brigade and remained there until 1960 when it too returned home to the UK. In February 1962, the 2nd Battalion arrived in Kenya where it joined the 24th Infantry Brigade. While there the battalion operated in support of the civil power there, which included in 1964, assistance during the mutiny of the 1st Battalion, The Kenya Rifles and in Uganda, sent a company to help in quelling the mutiny of the 1st Battalion, The Uganda Rifles, and the battalion departed Kenya that same year for home.

Elsewhere in 1964 the regiment's alliance with the Canadian Winnipeg Grenadiers came to an end, ending an alliance that had existed since 1933. The Winnipeg Grenadiers would disband the following year. In late 1964 the 1st Battalion deployed to Malaysia, which had only been formed the previous year, where it joined the 28th Commonwealth Brigade, and was based in Camp Terendak, Malacca. In 1965 the battalion undertook two tours in Borneo during the Indonesian Confrontation. The battalion's time in Borneo was quite similar to the 2nd Battalion's experiences in the Malaysian mainland during the Malayan Emergency, with patrols being undertaken against Indonesian incursions in the dense jungle that covered Borneo. The following year the 1st Battalion returned home from the Far East. That same year the 2nd Battalion deployed to West Germany where it was based in Iserlohn as part of 4th Armoured Brigade and the following year moved to Munster, Germany.

Actions in Northern Ireland
The 1st Battalion deployed for the first time to the Persian Gulf when it arrived in Sharjah, now part of the United Arab Emirates and left in late 1970. Also that year the 2nd Battalion returned home from Germany and deployed on a short tour of Northern Ireland which would be one of many for the regiment, and especially so during the 1970s. In 1971 the 2nd Battalion, due to defence cuts, was placed in 'suspended animation' and two companies were retained, but the following year, due to the change of Government, the battalion was reformed. Also in 1971 the 1st Battalion deployed to Ireland for the first time. Such deployments were difficult with troops being in constant danger from snipers and bombs, with patrols and guarding being the main routine duties. Their tour came to an end in December. During their deployment five men were lost to shooting and bombing incidents.

In 1972 the 1st Battalion deployed to West Germany where it was stationed in Munster as part of 4th Armoured Brigade. That same year the recently reformed 2nd Battalion undertook a tour of Northern Ireland and during its tour the battalion lost three of its men by gunfire. In May 1973 the 1st Battalion deployed to Northern Ireland, leaving in September to return to its base in Germany. The 2nd Battalion followed in late 1973 and suffered a fatality from sniper fire during its tour. In 1974 two members of the regiment lost their lives during an IRA bombing of two pubs in Guildford. Two members of the Women's Royal Army Corps and a civilian were also killed and dozens were wounded.

In 1975 the 1st Battalion deployed to Ireland yet again, though this time they did not suffer any fatalities during their four-month tour-of-duty and returned to Munster in August. The 2nd Battalion arrived in Belize in Central America for a five-month deployment. In January 1976 the 1st Battalion returned home from Germany while the 2nd Battalion journeyed in the opposite direction, being based in Munster. Later that year the 2nd Battalion deployed to Northern Ireland for another tour-of-duty fulfilling the usual roles of troops in Ireland before returning to Munster in January 1977. The 1st Battalion arrived in Northern Ireland later that year for a very brief tour there. In August 1978 the 1st Battalion returned again to Ireland for another four-month tour-of-duty. That year a member of the 2nd Battalion was killed while working undercover for the 14th Intelligence Company in Northern Ireland. In March 1980 the 1st Battalion deployed to Northern Ireland where it was stationed at Aldergrove for a deployment that would last until late 1981. The 2nd Battalion joined the 1st Battalion when it deployed to Northern Ireland in May 1980 for a five-month tour-of-duty. In late 1981 the 1st Battalion left Aldergrove and deployed to Hong Kong in the Far East on a two-year posting.

Falklands War
On 2 April 1982, Argentina, then under a dictatorship led by General Galtieri, invaded the British territory of the Falkland Islands off South America. The British soon assembled a large array of Royal Navy (RN) warships, Royal Fleet Auxiliaries and merchant ships and headed south for Ascension Island. On 25 April, the island of South Georgia, off Antarctica was recaptured and on 1 May the RN Carrier Battle Group had entered the 200-mile (370 km) Total Exclusion Zone (TEZ) which had been placed around the Falklands. On 12 May the 2nd Battalion, as part of the 5th Infantry Brigade (1st Battalion, The Welsh Guards, 1st/7th Duke of Edinburgh's Own Gurkha Rifles), embarked aboard Queen Elizabeth 2 (QE2), which had been requisitioned by the Government for use as a troopship, and departed Southampton for South Georgia. In the early hours of the 21 May D-Day began with 3 Commando Brigade (including two Para battalions) landing unopposed at San Carlos water and successfully established a bridgehead.

In late May the QE2 arrived at her destination but because she could not be risked by moving her closer to the Falklands, most of 5th Brigade were transferred to the P & O liner  who would then take them to their destination. On 2 June, Canberra anchored in San Carlos Water, and subsequently the Guards were landed at San Carlos by LCU, a day after the 1st/7th Gurkhas had been landed by LCU from the ferry Norland. On 5 June the Scots Guards were embarked aboard the assault ship  before being transferred to the ship's four LCUs who transported them to Bluff Cove. On 8 June the 1st Welsh Guards were aboard RFA Sir Galahad also waiting to be landed at Bluff Cove when Sir Galahad and RFA Sir Tristram were attacked by Argentinian Skyhawk fighters who proceeded to hit both ships. Sir Galahad was terribly hit and both ships caught fire, causing terrible casualties aboard Sir Galahad. Forty eight people, including thirty two Welsh Guards, were killed and many were wounded, many suffering from terrible burns. Unfortunately, only 200 survived.

On the morning of 13 June the Scots Guards were moved from their positions at Bluff Cove by helicopter to an assembly area near Goat Ridge near to their objective, Mount Tumbledown, which was defended by a crack Argentinian unit, the 5th Marine Infantry Battalion. On the night of the 13th the main force of the Scots Guards began its advance on the western side of Mount Tumbledown. During the course of the battle in the early hours of the 14th, men of the battalion launched a bayonet charge on the stout Argentinian defenders which resulted in bitter and bloody fighting, and was one of the last bayonet charges by the British Army. The battle raged on and by 8:00 am the final objective was taken and Mount Tumbledown was in the hands of the Scots Guards. The battle had been bloody, yet successful, and the battalion had proven the elite calibre and professionalism of the regiment in taking a well-defended mountain, defended by a top Argentinian unit, for it had been performing public duties back in London only a few months before. The Scots Guards casualties were eight Guards and one Royal Engineer killed, and forty three wounded. Their Argentinian opponents lost forty men and over thirty captured. See Battle of Mount Tumbledown.

On 14 June the Argentinian commander surrendered his forces of just under 10,000 men to the British, the war was over, though the end of hostilities would not officially be declared until 20 June. The following day, Juiliet Company (made up mostly of men of Naval Party 8901 who had defended the Falklands when it had been invaded) raised the Governor's flag above Government House, it had been down for seventy four days; the Falklands was finally liberated. Most of 5th Brigade were moved back to Fitzroy and the Scots Guards were subsequently moved to West Falkland to await the arrival of the first garrison troops and eventually departed the Falklands for Ascension on Norland on 19 July. The battalion was subsequently returned home by air, being transported by RAF VC-10 aircraft. The regiment won a number of gallantry awards for their actions in the Falklands War. A single Distinguished Service Order (DSO) was won, being awarded to the battalion's CO Lieutenant-Colonel Michael Scott. Also won by the battalion were two Military Crosses (MC), two Distinguished Conduct Medals (DCM) and two Military Medals (MM). The battalion was awarded two battle honours for its part in the war, "Tumbledown Mountain" and "Falkland Islands 1982".

Activity in the 1980s and 1990s
In 1984 the 1st Battalion returned from Hong Kong while the 2nd Battalion did the opposite and left for abroad, being deployed to the Sovereign Base Area, Cyprus where the battalion would remain until February 1986 when it returned home. In June the 1st Battalion took part once more in the Queen's Birthday Parade, a parade which was the last time Queen Elizabeth rode on horseback during the parade. In September the 1st Battalion deployed to Ireland on an emergency tour that lasted until January 1987 The 1st Battalion was presented with new Colours by Queen Elizabeth at Buckingham Palace and the regiment also takes part in the Queen's Birthday Parade. In October the 2nd Battalion deployed on the usual tour of NI, a tour that lasted until February 1988. That same month, the 1st Battalion deployed to Hohne, West Germany where it joined the 22nd Armoured Brigade.The 2nd Battalion also deployed abroad, when it took part in mechanised infantry exercises in the BATUS, Canada which lasted for 6-weeks. Also that year the 2nd Battalion was presented with new colours by the Queen at Hopeton House, Edinburgh In 1989 the 1st Battalion deployed on an emergency tour of East Tyrone, NI, a tour that lasted for about 4 months. The 2nd Battalion also deployed abroad, to Canada where they took part in 6-week exercises at the BATUS.

The first year of the 1990s brought much of the same for the Scots Guards when the 1st Battalion departed for 6-weeks of exercises at BATUS, Canada. The 1st Battalion did gain new equipment that year when it converted from the FV432 to the much more capable Warrior APC. In March the 2nd Battalion arrived in Northern Ireland for another tour, and during that year the regiment suffered one fatality in Ireland.

In November 1990, commanded by Lt. Col. Price, the Regimental Band of the Scots Guards set off to the Gulf to take part in Operation Granby. The band served in 33 Field Hospital in Kuwait as medics on various wards, as well as providing musical entertainment at the British ambassadors residence as well as playing for the coffins as they returned home. Musicians of the Scots Guards band can still be seen wearing their medals today. The 1st Battalion also deployed to the Persian Gulf as part of Operation Granby, the British contribution to the war against Saddam Hussein, for which the battalion was awarded the theatre honour "Gulf 1991". That same year the 2nd Battalion took part in the Queen's Birthday Parade.

Other events in 1992 for the regiment included the 2nd Battalion providing the Royal Guard at Balmoral Castle, participating in the Edinburgh Military Tattoo, in which the regiment has participated in many times. Also that year the regiment celebrated at Holyrood Palace, the 350th Anniversary of the regiment's creation. In 1993 the 2nd Battalion took part in 6-week exercises at BATUS in Canada but on 4 November, due to defence cuts, the battalion was placed in 'suspended animation' and a single company (F Company) was formed for public and other duties. In 1994 the 1st Battalion deployed on a tour of Ireland that lasted for 6-months. The following year saw the 1st Battalion take part in the Queen's Birthday Parade and deploy to Canada for 6-weeks of exercises at BATUS. In 1996 the battalion deployed once more to Ireland and the following year the regiment takes part in the Queen's Birthday Parade. In 1998 the 1st Battalion deployed to Abercorn Barracks at Ballykinler, Ireland on a 2-year posting and returned home.

The McBride shooting

In 1992 the 1st Battalion deployed to Belfast, Northern Ireland and during that six-month tour the battalion suffered two fatalities. In September of this tour, two members of the 1st Battalion were involved in the shooting of an unarmed civilian, 18-year-old Peter McBride. During a routine patrol of the New Lodge area of Belfast, Guardsmen Mark Wright and James Fisher came across McBride. He was searched and found to have no weapons and no outstanding warrants. Frightened by the confrontation, McBride ran from the Guardsmen, who responded by shooting him in the back. Seriously wounded, McBride collapsed across a car and slid to the ground, where he was again shot in the back.

In 1995, Wright and Fisher were convicted of the shooting, and given life sentences. However, they were freed in 1998 according to the provisions of the Good Friday Agreement, which provides for the early release of prisoners (in both Britain and Ireland) serving sentences in connection with the activities of paramilitary groups. Upon release, the two men were reinstated into the British Army, despite Queen's regulations stating that any member given a custodial sentence in a civilian court must be dismissed, barring "exceptional reasons". This decision caused a great deal of controversy in Northern Ireland, with national politicians such as Belfast Lord Mayor Martin Morgan speaking out against it. McBride's mother and sister have continued their activism against this decision.

Dawn of a new millennium

For the regiment, activities in the new millennium began similarly to the 1990s. The 1st Battalion was deployed to Ireland in 2000. Later that year, the battalion also deployed to Kenya for exercises that lasted 6 weeks. A contingent of the Scots Guards was also deployed to Sierra Leone in West Africa. In 2001 the 1st Battalion was back in Ireland, and a single company stayed there for 6 months. When the Queen Mother died in March 2002, only a month after her daughter, Princess Margaret, the regiment was very active contributing to the funeral. On 5 April, 6 officers and 300 other Guardsmen of various ranks took part in the funeral procession to Westminster Hall where the late Queen Mother would be lying-in-state until 9 April. Officers of the regiment took turns at standing vigil in Westminster Hall around the Queen Mother's coffin. Later that month, the 1st Battalion and F Company were presented with their new Colours by Queen Elizabeth at Windsor Castle. On 15 June the battalion took part in the Queen's Birthday Parade, a parade that was all the more significant because 2002 was also the year of Queen Elizabeth's Golden Jubilee, her 50th year as Queen. The regiment was also celebrating its 360th year, and had been the first regiment (the 2nd Battalion) to parade the Colour for Queen Elizabeth in 1952. The battalion and F Company were also involved in firefighting duties as part of Operation Fresco during the firefighters' strike. The Scots Guards, as did all other armed forces units, used vintage Army Green Goddess fire engines. The Scots Guards operated in Greater London during their firefighting duties.

In 2003 the 1st Battalion deployed to Münster, Germany where it joined British Forces Germany (BFG) on a 6-year posting. Also that year, F Company deployed abroad to take part in exercises in the ex-Soviet state of Kazakhstan. In 2004 the 1st Battalion deployed to Iraq on a 6-month posting as part of 4th Armoured Brigade. The 4th Brigade relieved 1st Mechanised Brigade, and joined the Multi-National Division (South East), which was under UK command. The Multi-National Division provided security to south-east Iraq until 2009, when command was transferred to the United States Army.

Under the British Army reforms announced in 2004, the Scots Guards remained as a single battalion regiment, and were given a fixed role as an armoured infantry battalion. They were moved from Münster to Catterick, North Yorkshire, in northern England in 2009. In 2011, the 1st Battalion undertook public duties for the first time in many years, in conjunction with it having its Queen's Colour trooped during the Queen's Birthday Parade. For this, elements of the battalion moved from Catterick to Pirbright for a time.

In 2021, the 1st Battalion moved Somme Barracks, Catterick Garrison as part of the Army 2020 Refine reforms.

On 1 May 2022 (delayed from the originally intended 1 April 2022), soldiers in A (The London Scottish) Company, the London Regiment transferred to foot guards regiments and the company became G (Messines) Company, Scots Guards, 1st Battalion London Guards.

References

External links
Scots Guards Association - History

Scots Guards
20th-century history of the British Army
Military units and formations of the United Kingdom in the Falklands War
Military units and formations of the Gulf War